The Edward L. Hainz House (nicknamed Linger Longer) is a historic house located at 155 West Center Avenue in Sebring, Florida.

Description and history 
The house has three low pitched gable roofs with exposed rafters, tails and purlins. The roof has two interior brick chimneys on the west side. The main facade is fronted by the staggered roof lines and the oversized battered posts at the recessed front porch. A central multi-pane entrance is flanked by ten pane side lights. It has clapboard and rolled composition roofing. Fenestration on the main block is regular 1/1 double hung woodsash. The partial second story contains a three double casement wood sashes with a common surround.

It was added to the National Register of Historic Places on August 14, 1989.

References

External links
 Highlands County listings at National Register of Historic Places
 Highlands County listings at Florida's Office of Cultural and Historical Programs

Houses in Highlands County, Florida
Houses on the National Register of Historic Places in Florida
Buildings and structures in Sebring, Florida
National Register of Historic Places in Highlands County, Florida
1917 establishments in Florida
Houses completed in 1919